The 2022 Italian general election took place on 25 September 2022. In Trentino-Alto Adige/Südtirol, 14 seats were up for election: 8 for the Chamber of Deputies and 6 for the Senate of the Republic.

Background

Since the 2018 Italian general election, many changes started to occur in the Trentino-Alto Adige/Südtirol political landscape. For the first time since the 1996 Italian general election, the centre-right coalition managed to defeat the centre-left coalition in Trentino in a general election. Shortly thereafter, the Trentino Tyrolean Autonomist Party (PATT) decided to run separately (German: Blockfrei), leading to the first victory of the Maurizio Fugatti-led centre-right coalition in a provincial election in Trentino since the start of the Second Italian Republic with the 1994 Italian general election.

In South Tyrol, the traditionally dominant-party system led by the South Tyrolean People's Party (SVP) lost its majority in the 2013 Trentino-Alto Adige/Südtirol provincial elections. In the 2018 general election, the SVP and the Democratic Party of the centre-left coalition lost their majority, forcing SVP to form a coalition with Lega due to the  system (Italian: proporzionale etnica). In the 2019 European Parliament election in Trentino-Alto Adige/Südtirol, the SVP broke their traditional alliance with the PD and joined forces with the centre-right Forza Italia.

Results
Chamber of Deputies

Source: Ministry of the Interior

PR vote in Trentino

PR vote in South Tyrol

Senate of the Republic

Vote in Trentino

Vote in South Tyrol

Elected members of Parliament

Chamber of Deputies
Brothers of Italy
Alessia Ambrosi
Andrea de Bertoldi
Südtiroler Volkspartei
Renate Gebhard
Manfred Schullian
Dieter Steger
Democratic Party
Ferrari Sara
Lega
Vanessa Cattoi
Source: Ministry of the Interior

Senate of the Republic
Südtiroler Volkspartei
Meinhard Durnwalder
Julia Unterberger
Democratic Party
Pietro Patton
Luigi Spagnolli
Lega
Elena Testor
Forza Italia
Michaela Biancofiore
Source: Ministry of the Interior

See also
2022 Italian general election in Aosta Valley
Proporz
Results of the 2022 Italian general election

References

2022 elections in Italy
Elections in Trentino-Alto Adige/Südtirol
September 2022 events in Italy